Hyloxalus breviquartus is a species of frog in the family Dendrobatidae. It is found in the northern part of Cordillera Occidental in Antioquia, Colombia, and in Carchi Province in northwestern Ecuador. Colombian distribution may be wider.
Its natural habitats are montane forests next to streams and very humid premontane forests. It is threatened by habitat loss, although it occurs in the Las Orquídeas National Natural Park, its type locality.

Description
Females measure  in snout–vent length.

References

breviquartus
Amphibians of the Andes
Amphibians of Colombia
Amphibians of Ecuador
Taxa named by Marco Antonio Serna Díaz
Taxa named by Juan A. Rivero
Amphibians described in 1986
Taxonomy articles created by Polbot
Fauna of the northwestern Andean montane forests